Matthew Wilhelm (born February 2, 1981) is a former American college and professional football player and a current radio/TV football analyst.

He was a linebacker in the National Football League (NFL) for eight seasons during the early 2000s.  He played college football for Ohio State University, and earned All-American honors.  He was drafted by the San Diego Chargers in the fourth round of the 2003 NFL Draft, also played for the San Francisco 49ers and Green Bay Packers of the NFL, and was a member of the Packers' Super Bowl XLV championship team that beat the Pittsburgh Steelers.  He is currently a football analyst/show host for WKNR AM 850 and WEWS-TV 5 in Cleveland.

Early years
Wilhelm was born in Oberlin, Ohio, and grew up in Lorain, Ohio.  He attended Elyria Catholic High School in Elyria, Ohio.  He amassed 100 tackles, 26 for loss, and 11 sacks as a senior, and was named a first-team All-Ohio selection.  He also played tight end and running back. In 2002, his high school retired his No. 34 jersey.

College career
Wilhelm attended Ohio State University, and played for coach John Cooper and coach Jim Tressel's Ohio State Buckeyes football teams from 1999 to 2002.  Wilhelm was moved to middle linebacker before his sophomore season and started every game.  In his first game as a starter against Fresno State, Wilhelm intercepted a David Carr pass and ran it 25 yards for a touchdown. The following year, he earned the Randy Gradishar Award as the team's top linebacker and made all of the defensive calls.  As a senior in 2002, Wilhelm was recognized as a consensus first-team All-American, and helped his team win a BCS National Championship with a team-leading 11 tackles in a 31–24 Fiesta Bowl victory over the Miami Hurricanes. Wilhelm ended the year with a career-high 121 tackles and ended his career with the 6th most career tackles for loss for Ohio State all-time.

Professional career

San Diego Chargers
Wilhelm was drafted by the San Diego Chargers in the fourth round of the 2003 NFL Draft. He spent the first four years of his career mostly on special teams and as a backup. In 2007, he became a full-time starter after Donnie Edwards signed with the Kansas City Chiefs. He was released by the Chargers on July 24, 2009.

Philadelphia Eagles
Wilhelm was signed by the Philadelphia Eagles on August 4, 2009, after starting middle linebacker Stewart Bradley suffered a season-ending knee injury. He was waived on September 5, 2009.

San Francisco 49ers
Wilhelm was signed by the San Francisco 49ers on October 19, 2009, after reserve linebacker Jeff Ulbrich was placed on injured reserve. He was re-signed to a one-year contract on March 4, 2010. He was cut on September 3, 2010.

Green Bay Packers
Wilhelm was signed by the Green Bay Packers on October 26, 2010.

Retirement
After winning Super Bowl XLV as a member of the Packers, Wilhelm decided to retire from the NFL.  In 2013, he was hired by Cleveland radio station WKNR AM 850 to be a football analyst, co-host of Cleveland Browns Daily, and serve as a co-host for the station's Ohio State Buckeyes pregame show. He also appears on Cleveland ABC affiliate WEWS-TV 5 as a Buckeyes and Browns analyst.

In 2016, Wilhelm's hometown paper, The Morning Journal, changed the name of its annual high school football Player of the Year award to The Matt Wilhelm Award in recognition of Wilhelm's lifetime of football achievements.

In 2017, Wilhelm was announced as a member of the 2017 Lorain Sports Hall of Fame class.

Awards and honors

High school
1998 All-Ohio First-team

College
2002 All-Big Ten First-team
2002 Consensus All-American
2002 National Championship (as a member of the Ohio State Buckeyes)

NFL
Super Bowl XLV winner (as a member of the Green Bay Packers)

References

External links
 
 Green Bay Packers bio

1981 births
Living people
All-American college football players
American football linebackers
Green Bay Packers players
Ohio State Buckeyes football players
People from Oberlin, Ohio
Philadelphia Eagles players
Players of American football from Ohio
San Diego Chargers players
San Francisco 49ers players
Sportspeople from Lorain, Ohio